Eğirdir is a town and district of Isparta Province in the Mediterranean region of Turkey.

History
The town and the lake were formerly called Eğridir, a Turkish pronunciation and possible appropriation of the town's old Greek name Akrotori. Moreover, the name "Eğridir" means '(It) is bent.'.

The town was founded by the Hittites before falling to the Phrygians in around 1200 BC, and subsequently being conquered by the Lydians, the Persians and the forces of Alexander the Great. The Romans called the town Prostanna. During the Byzantine era, when it acquired its name of Akrotiri ("peninsula"), it was the seat of a bishopric. The Seljuks conquered it around 1080 and held it until the Hamidoğulları tribe made it the capital of a small principality in 1280, which lasted until 1381. The 14th century traveller Ibn Battuta described it as "a great and populous city with fine bazaars and running streams, fruit trees and orchards", which was situated beside "a lake of sweet water". The Ottomans took control in 1417. Most of its population consisted of Greek Orthodox people until the population exchanges of the 1920s.

Features

Eğirdir lies between Lake Eğirdir and the Mount Sivri, and contains the Eğirdir Castle said to have been built by Croesus, king of Lydia, although additions were built by the Romans, Byzantines, and Seljuks.

The population of Eğirdir was 19,469 in 2010, but swells in the summer months as part-time residents return for the holidays. Eğirdir is a fishing community and local residents fish in Lake Eğirdir year round.

Yeşil Ada (Turkish for "green island") is a small island connected to Eğirdir by a short causeway. Restaurants, hotels, pensions (pansyons or hostels), and a few private residences fill the island. Known for its past as a Greek village, Yeşıl Ada still has quite a few stone homes remaining from the Greek era.

Locals claim that Eğirdir is home to the world's only walk-through minaret.

See also
List of lakes in Turkey
Sirmione (Sirmio peninsula) on Lake Garda in Italy

References

Gallery

External links

 District municipality's official website 
 Egirdir, Turkey Information Website 

Populated places in Isparta Province
Fishing communities in Turkey
 
Towns in Turkey
Cittaslow